Michael Craig Roberson  is an American attorney and politician who served in the Nevada Senate from 2010 until 2018, representing the 20th district. A Republican, Roberson was Senate Majority Leader from 2014 until 2016, and Senate Minority Leader from 2013 to 2014 and again from 2016 to 2018. He is responsible for passing the largest tax increase in Nevada's history, the 2015 Commerce Tax.

On August 21, 2017, Roberson announced that he will be running for Lieutenant Governor of Nevada; the incumbent, Mark Hutchison, announced that he would not be seeking a second term in the 2018 election. After winning the Republican nomination, Roberson lost in the general election to the Democratic candidate, Kate Marshall.

References

External links
Campaign website
Project Vote Smart - Senator Michael Roberson(NV) profile
Follow the Money - Michael Roberson
2010

|-

|-

|-

1970 births
Living people
21st-century American politicians
Candidates in the 2018 United States elections
Republican Party Nevada state senators
People from Henderson, Nevada
People from Webb City, Missouri
Politicians from Carson City, Nevada
University of Kansas School of Law alumni